Alior Bank SA  is a large universal bank in Poland. It forms the 10th largest financial group in the country, with more than 6,000 employees as of end of 2015.

History

Founded in 2008 by an Italian group Carlo Tassara, the bank debuted on Warsaw Stock Exchange in 2012 with an offering valued at 2.1 billion Polish złoty, the highest in the exchange's history. In 2014, Alior's stock price became part of WIG20 index.

In 2013, the bank attracted controversy when its deputy president mentioned that the bank considers collecting big data of its customers, pulling information from online social networks etc.

Since 2015, the bank commenced a series of mergers and acquisitions, most notably acquiring Meritum Bank (2015) and Bank BPH (2016). In autumn 2014, Alior Bank purchased 97.9% of Meritum Bank. On 19 February 2015 the transaction was finished.

On June 23, 2015, the Polish Financial Supervision Authority authorized the merger of Alior Bank S.A. and Meritum Bank ICB S.A. by transferring all of Meritum Bank's assets to Alior Bank. The banks merged on October 24–26, 2015

In June 2015, State-controlled PZU, Poland's largest insurer agreed to buy a 25.3-percent stake in Alior Bank.

See also

List of banks
List of banks in Poland

References

External links
 

Banks established in 2008
Banks of Poland
Companies based in Warsaw
Companies listed on the Warsaw Stock Exchange
Polish brands